Charles Pitman may refer to:

 Charles Wesley Pitman (died 1871), Whig member of the U.S. House of Representatives from Pennsylvania
 Charles Pitman (game warden) (1890–1975), herpetologist and conservationist
 C.M. Pitman (Charles Murray Pitman, 1872–1948), British judge and rower
 Charles H. Pitman (1935–2020), United States Marine Corps general

See also
Charles Pittman (disambiguation)